Hundert is a surname. Notable people with the surname include:

Edward M. Hundert, American academic
Joachim Hundert (1920–1944), German Wehrmacht officer

See also
Hundelt